Vico C (born Luis Armando Lozada Cruz on September 8, 1971) is a Puerto Rican rapper and reggaeton songwriter.  He is one of the founding fathers of reggaeton and the real father of rap music in Puerto Rico. Vico C has played an influential role in the development of Latin American hip hop.

Albums 
Studio albums

Live albums

Compilation albums

Singles

As lead artist

As guest artist

Music videos

As lead artist

As guest artist

Collaborations

As lead artist

As guest artist

References 

Reggaeton discographies
Discographies of Puerto Rican artists